Leesville High School is a school located in Leesville, Louisiana, United States. The 9-12 school is a part of the Vernon Parish School Board.

School uniforms
This means that students can wear clothing that conforms to the Vernon Parish Dress code or uniforms, if they wish.

All other campuses are uniform-optional and must follow the Vernon Parish Dress Code or wear uniforms.

Athletics
Leesville High athletics competes in the LHSAA.

Notable alumni

 Hannah Aspden, paralympic athlete  
 Cecil Collins, Class of 1996, NFL running back
 Millicent S. Ficken, Class of 1951, ornithologist
 Michael Ford, Class of 2009, LSU running back
Eddie Fuller, Class of 1986, National Football League player, running back with the Buffalo Bills
 Carolyn Huntoon, Class of 1958, scientist; first woman director of the Johnson Space Center in Houston, Texas' sister of Buddy Leach 
 Buddy Leach, Class of 1951, Louisiana politician, brother of Carolyn Huntoon
 Demond Mallet, professional basketball player
 Kevin Mawae, Class of 1989, NFL center and member of Pro Football Hall of Fame 
 Jim McCrery, Class of 1967, Congressman
 Kavika Pittman, Class of 1993, NFL defensive end
 Keith Smith, Class of 1999, NFL cornerback
 Keith Zinger, Class of 2003, NFL tight end

Notable faculty
 Louisiana State Senator, Gerald Long of Natchitoches taught social studies and coached at Leesville High School in the late 1960s.

References

External links

 
 Leesville High School

Public high schools in Louisiana
Schools in Vernon Parish, Louisiana
Educational institutions established in 1900
1900 establishments in Louisiana